Tenual is a natural product derived from Asphodeline tenuior. It is a 3-benzoxepin derivative with methoxy, methyl, hydroxymethyl, and carbaldehyde side chains.

References

Benzoxepines
Hydroxymethyl compounds
Methoxy compounds
Aromatic aldehydes